Orefice is a surname. Notable people with the surname include:

Antonio Orefice (fl. 1708–1734), Italian composer
Giacomo Orefice (1865–1922), Italian composer
Lauren Orefice, American neuroscientist